Dylan Alcott defeated Niels Vink in the final, 7–5, 6–2 to win the quad singles wheelchair tennis title at the 2021 US Open. With the win, Alcott completed the Golden Slam, becoming the first wheelchair tennis player to do so (alongside Diede de Groot in the women's singles event).

Sam Schröder was the defending champion, but was defeated in the quarterfinals by Vink.

Seeds

Draw

Finals

References

External links 
 Draw

Wheelchair Quad Singles
U.S. Open, 2021 Quad Singles